The 2022–23 season is the 143rd season of competitive football by Rangers.

Players

Squad information

Transfers

In

First team

Academy

Out

First team

Academy

New contracts

First team

Academy

Awards

Pre-season and friendlies

Competitions

Overall

Scottish Premiership

League table

Results by round

Matches

Scottish Cup

Scottish League Cup

UEFA Champions League

Third qualifying round

Play-off round

Group stage

Squad statistics
The table below includes all players registered with the SPFL as part of the Rangers squad for the 2022–23 season. They may not have made an appearance.

Appearances and goals
{| class="wikitable sortable" style="text-align:center"
|-
!rowspan="2" style="background:#00a; color:white;" |No.
!rowspan="2" style="background:#00a; color:white;" |Pos.
!rowspan="2" style="background:#00a; color:white;" |Nat.
!rowspan="2" style="background:#00a; color:white;" |Name
!colspan="2" style="background:#00a; color:white;" |Totals
!colspan="2" style="background:#00a; color:white;" |Scottish Premiership
!colspan="2" style="background:#00a; color:white;" |Scottish Cup
!colspan="2" style="background:#00a; color:white;" |League Cup
!colspan="2" style="background:#00a; color:white;" |Champions League
|-
!Apps
!Goals
!Apps
!Goals
!Apps
!Goals
!Apps
!Goals
!Apps
!Goals
|-
! colspan=14 style=background:#dcdcdc; text-align:center| Goalkeepers
|-

|-
! colspan=14 style=background:#dcdcdc; text-align:center| Defenders
|-

|-
! colspan=14 style=background:#dcdcdc; text-align:center| Midfielders
|-

|-
! colspan=14 style=background:#dcdcdc; text-align:center| Forwards
|-

|-
! colspan=14 style=background:#dcdcdc; text-align:center| Players transferred or loaned out during the season who made an appearance
|-

|-
 Appearances (starts and substitute appearances) and goals include those in Scottish Premiership, Scottish Cup, Scottish League Cup and UEFA Champions League.

Discipline

Yellow cards

Red cards

Clean sheets

Footnotes

Notes

References

Rangers F.C. seasons
Rangers
2022–23 UEFA Champions League participants seasons